St. John's Church, Church of St. John, or variants, thereof, (Saint John or St. John usually refers to John the Baptist, but also, sometimes, to John the Apostle or John the Evangelist)  may refer to the following churches, former churches or other places:

Armenia
Church of Saint John, Mastara

Australia
St John's Church, Adelaide, an Anglican church
St John's, Ashfield. a suburb of Sydney
St John's Anglican Church, Darlinghurst, New South Wales
St John's Anglican Church, Wentworth

Barbados
St. John's Parish Church, Barbados

Belgium
Church of St John the Evangelist, Liège

China
St John's Church, Chengdu
St. John's Church, Fuzhou
St. John's Church, Suzhou

Denmark
St. John's Church, Aarhus
St. John's Church, Copenhagen

Estonia
St. John's Church, Tartu
St. John's Church, Tallinn
St. John's Church, Valga
St. John's Church, Viljandi

Finland
St. John's Church, Helsinki
St. John's Church, Tampere

Germany
St. Johannes Evangelist, Cappenberg
American Church of St. John, Dresden
St. John's Church, Lüneburg
Neustädter Kirche, Hanover (Neustädter Kirche St. Johannis)
Meissen Cathedral, Church of St John and St Donatus

India
St. John in the Wilderness Church (Dharamshala)
St. John's Church, Meerut
St. John's Church, Kolkata
St. John's Church, Secunderabad
St. John's Church, Midnapore

Ireland
Church of Saint John the Evangelist, Kilkenny
Church of Our Lady and St John, Inishmaan, Aran Islands 
St. John's Church, Ballinasloe

Italy
Archbasilica of Saint John Lateran, Rome

Latvia
St. John's Church, Riga

Lithuania
Church of St. Johns, Vilnius

Luxembourg
St. John's Church, Luxembourg, location of a Black Madonna

Netherlands
Sint Janskerk or St. John's Church, Gouda
Janskerk, Haarlem or St. John's Church
St. John's Cathedral ('s-Hertogenbosch)

New Zealand
St John's Anglican Church, Trentham, Wellington

Norway
St John's Church, Bergen

Pakistan
St. John's Church (Jhelum)

Romania
Saint John's Church, Sibiu

Russia
St. John's Church (Saint Petersburg)
Chesme Church or Church of Saint John at Chesme Palace
Church of St. John the Warrior, Moscow

Saint Helena
Saint John's Church, Jamestown

South Korea
St. John's Church, Seongnam

Sweden
Saint John's Church, Habo
St. John's Church, Malmö
St. John's Church, Stockholm

Switzerland
Stadtpfarrkirche Rapperswil or Stadtpfarrkirche St. Johann
Münster Schaffhausen or parish of St. Johann Schaffhausen Münster

Turkey
Saint John's Church, Gülşehir

United Kingdom

England

Birmingham
St John's Church, Sparkhill

Buckinghamshire
St. Mary's & St John's, Bletchley

Cambridgeshire
St John's Church, Duxford
St John the Baptist's Church, Papworth St Agnes
St John the Baptist's Church, Parson Drove

Cheshire
St John the Baptist's Church, Aldford
St John the Evangelist's Church, Alvanley
St John the Evangelist's Church, Ashton Hayes
St John's Church, Burwardsley
St John the Evangelist's Church, Chelford
St John the Baptist's Church, Chester
St John's Church, Cotebrook
St John's Church, Doddington
St John the Baptist's Church, Guilden Sutton
St John's Church, Hartford
St John's Church, High Legh
St John the Evangelist's Church, Kingsley
St John the Baptist's Church, Knutsford
St John the Evangelist's Church, Norley
St John the Evangelist's Church, Sandbach Heath
St John the Evangelist's Church, Sandiway
St John's Church, Threapwood
St John the Evangelist's Church, Toft
St John the Evangelist's Church, Warrington
St John the Evangelist's Church, Weston, Runcorn
St John the Evangelist's Church, Winsford

Cornwall
Church of St Morwenna and St John the Baptist, Morwenstow

Cumbria
St John the Baptist's Church, Blawith
St John the Evangelist's Church, Crosscanonby
St John the Evangelist's Church, Cowgill
St John's Church, Hutton Roof
St John's Church, Gamblesby, decommissioned
St John the Evangelist's Church, Newton Arlosh
St John the Evangelist's Church, Osmotherley
St John's Church, St John's in the Vale
St John the Evangelist's Church, Woodland
St John's Church, Workington

Derbyshire
St John the Baptist's Chapel, Matlock Bath

East Sussex
St John the Baptist's Church, Brighton
St John the Evangelist Church, Heron's Ghyll
St John the Baptist's Church, Hove
St John the Evangelist's Church, Preston Village, Brighton
St John the Evangelist's Church, St Leonards-on-Sea
Church of St John sub Castro, Lewes

Greater Manchester
St John the Evangelist's Church, Abram
St John's Church, Dukinfield
St John's Church, Manchester
St John the Divine's Church, Pemberton

Hampshire
St John's Church, Hedge End
Church of St John the Baptist, Upper Eldon
St. John the Baptist Church, Winchester

Herefordshire
St John the Baptist's Church, Llanrothal

Hertfordshire
St John's Church, Letty Green

Isle of Wight
St John's Church, Oakfield, Ryde
St John's Church, Wroxall

Kent
St John the Evangelist, Kingsdown

Lancashire
St John the Baptist's Church, Arkholme
St John's Church, Blackpool
St John the Baptist's Church, Bretherton
St John the Baptist Church, Burscough
St John the Evangelist's Church, Clifton
St John the Evangelist's Church, Crawshawbooth
St John's Church, Ellel
St John's Church, Great Harwood
St John the Evangelist's Church, Gressingham
St John the Evangelist's Church, Lancaster
St John's Church, Lytham
St John the Divine's Church, Morecambe
St John's Minster, Preston
Old St John the Baptist's Church, Pilling
St John the Baptist's Church, Pilling
St John's Church, Rawtenstall
St John's Church, Silverdale
St John the Evangelist's Church, Turncroft
St John the Baptist's Church, Tunstall
St John the Evangelist's Church, Worsthorne
St John the Evangelist's Church, Yealand Conyers

Lincolnshire
St John the Baptist's Church, Burringham
St John the Baptist's Church, Stamford
St John the Baptist's Church, Sutterby
St John the Baptist's Church, Yarburgh

London
St John's, Notting Hill
St John's Chapel, Bedford Row
St John's Chapel, London, Tower of London
St John-at-Hampstead
St John's, Smith Square, a former church, now a concert hall
St John's Downshire Hill, Hampstead
St John the Evangelist, Palmers Green
St John's Church, Stratford
Saint Mark's Coptic Orthodox Church (London) or St John's
St John, Friern Barnet, an Anglican church
Church of St John-at-Hackney

Merseyside
St John's Church, Birkdale
St John's Church, Egremont
St John the Evangelist's Church, Kirkdale

Norfolk
St John the Baptist's Church, Hellington
Saint John the Baptist, Maddermarket, Norwich

Northamptonshire
St John the Baptist's Church, Wakerley
Church of St. John the Baptist, Achurch

Oxfordshire
St John the Baptist's Church, Mongewell
St John the Evangelist Church, Oxford

Staffordshire
St John's Church, Wolverhampton

Sheffield
St John's Church, Ranmoor

Somerset
Church of St John the Baptist, Axbridge
Church of St John the Baptist, Carhampton
Church of St John the Baptist, Churchill
Church of St John the Baptist, Glastonbury
Church of St John the Baptist, Hatch Beauchamp
Church of St John the Baptist, Midsomer Norton
Church of St John the Evangelist, Milborne Port
Church of St John the Baptist, Pawlett
Church of St John the Baptist, Pilton
Church of St John the Baptist, Wellington

Suffolk
St John the Baptist's Church, Stanton

Surrey
St John's Church, Egham

Tyne and Wear
St John's Church, Gateshead Fell

Warwickshire
St John the Baptist's Church, Avon Dassett

West Sussex
St John the Evangelist's Church, Burgess Hill
St John the Evangelist's Church, Chichester
St John the Baptist's Church, Crawley

Wiltshire
St John the Baptist Church, Inglesham
St John's Church, Warminster

Worcestershire
St John the Baptist's Church, Strensham

Yorkshire
St John the Evangelist's Church, Cadeby, South Yorkshire
St John and All Saints' Church, Easingwold, North Yorkshire
St John the Evangelist's Church, Leeds, West Yorkshire
St John the Baptist's Church, Stanwick, North Yorkshire
St John's Church, Throapham, South Yorkshire
Church of St John the Divine, Calder Grove, West Yorkshire

Scotland
Church of St John the Evangelist, Edinburgh
St John's Renfield Church, Glasgow
St John the Evangelist's Church, Greenock

Wales
St John's Church, Aberdare, Rhondda Cynon Taff
St John's Church, Abergavenny, Monmouthsire (now a masonic lodge)
St John's Church, Dowlais, Merthyr Tyfil County Borough
St John the Baptist's Church, Old Colwyn, Denbighshire
St John's Church, Trofarth, Conwy County Borough

United States

California
St. John's Presbyterian Church (Berkeley, California)
St. John's Presbyterian Church (San Francisco, California)

Connecticut
St. John Church (Darien, Connecticut)

Georgia
St. John's Church (Savannah, Georgia)

Indiana
St. John the Evangelist Catholic Church (Indianapolis)

Iowa
St. John's United Methodist Church (Davenport, Iowa)
Basilica of St. John (Des Moines, Iowa)
St. John's Episcopal Church (Keokuk, Iowa)

Maryland
St. John's Episcopal Church (Ellicott City, Maryland)
St. John's Episcopal Church (Fort Washington, Maryland)
Saint John's Church (Hagerstown, Maryland)
St. John's Lutheran Church (Hagerstown, Maryland)
St. John's Lutheran Church (Parkville, Maryland)
St. John's Church (Ruxton, Maryland)
St. John the Evangelist Catholic Church (Frederick, Maryland)
St. John the Evangelist Catholic Church (Silver Spring, Maryland)

Massachusetts
St. John's Catholic Church (Worcester, Massachusetts)

Michigan
St. John's Lutheran Church (Port Hope, Michigan)

Minnesota
Saint John's Abbey, Collegeville
St. John's Lutheran Church (Northfield, Minnesota)

Missouri
St. John's Evangelical Lutheran Church (Corning, Missouri)

Nebraska
St. John's Parish (Omaha, Nebraska)

New Hampshire
St. John's Church (Portsmouth, New Hampshire)

New Jersey
St. John's Church (Newark, New Jersey)
St. John's Church (Orange, New Jersey)
St. John's Episcopal Church (Somerville, New Jersey), a listed on the National Register of Historic Places in Somerset County, New Jersey

New York
St. John's Church Complex (Delhi, New York)
St. John the Baptist Roman Catholic Church (Plattsburgh, New York)
St. John the Evangelist's Church (Pawling)
in New York City
St. John the Baptist Church (Manhattan)
St. John the Evangelist Church (Manhattan)
St. John the Martyr Church (New York City)
St. John's Church (Bronx)
Church of St. John Nepomucene (Manhattan)
St. John's Chapel (New York City)

North Carolina
St. John's Lutheran Church (Conover, North Carolina)
St. John's Lutheran Church (Salisbury, North Carolina)

Ohio
St. John's Lutheran Church (Petersburg, Ohio)
St. John's Lutheran Church (Dublin, Ohio), a National Register of Historic Places listing in Franklin County, Ohio
St. John's Evangelical Lutheran Church (Stovertown, Ohio)
St. John's Lutheran Church (Zanesville, Ohio)
St. John the Baptist Catholic Church (Canton, Ohio)

Pennsylvania
St. John's Church (Concord, Pennsylvania)

South Carolina
St. John's Lutheran Church (Pomaria, South Carolina)
St. John's Lutheran Church (Walhalla, South Carolina)

Texas
St. John's Church (Brownwood, Texas), NRHP-listed in Brown County

Virginia
St. John's Church (Chuckatuck, Virginia)
St. John's Church (Chula, Virginia)
St. John's Episcopal Church (Hampton, Virginia)
St. John's Episcopal Church (Richmond, Virginia)
St. John's Church (Sweet Hall, Virginia)

Washington, D.C. 

St. John's Episcopal Church, Georgetown
St. John's Episcopal Church, Lafayette Square

Wisconsin
Saint John's Evangelical Lutheran Church (Milwaukee, Wisconsin)

See also 
Janskerk (disambiguation), Dutch
St. John the Baptist Church (disambiguation)
St. John's Cathedral (disambiguation)
St. John's Chapel (disambiguation)
St. John's Episcopal Church (disambiguation)
St. John the Evangelist Church (disambiguation)
St. John's Parish (disambiguation)

lv:Sv.Jāņa baznīca
nl:Iglesia de San Juan de Dios